Rob Novak (born March 20, 1986) is a runner who specialized in the 800 meters. He represented the United States at the 2008 NACAC U23 Championships, where he placed first overall in the men's 800 meters. He ran at the 2012 US Olympic Trials.

Running career

High school
Novak attended Bordentown Regional High School, graduating in 2005. In his freshman year, he ran 4:52 in a 1600-meter trial in his gym class. He had a background in American football, in which he played for Bordentown as wide receiver. At one point before high school he was diagnosed with asthma.

Collegiate
Novak attended Seton Hall University with a track scholarship. There he would be coached by John Marshall, who was also an 800-meter runner at Plainfield High School in the 1980s and would go on to compete at the 1984 Summer Olympics. While at college, he was called up by the US national team to compete at the 2008 NACAC U23 Championships in Toluca, Mexico, where he would go on to win the men's 800 meters.

Post-collegiate
After his spell at Seton Hall, Novak trained and competed with New York Athletic Club. He ran sat the 2012 US Olympic Trials and made it to the semi-final round of the men's 800 meters, where he placed 13th of 16 competitors.

References

American male middle-distance runners
1986 births
Living people
Bordentown Regional High School alumni
People from Bordentown, New Jersey
Seton Hall Pirates men's track and field athletes
Sportspeople from Burlington County, New Jersey
Track and field athletes from New Jersey